Lionel Cronjé (born 25 May 1989) is a South African rugby union footballer, currently playing for The Sharks in the Carling Currie Cup. He is a versatile back-line player who can operate as a fly-half or full-back.

Career

Cronjé previously played for the Stormers and Western Province before making the move north ahead of the 2012 Super Rugby season. He could play only five matches for the Blue Bulls due to a chest injury suffered in February 2012.

He was released by the Sharks in November 2015.

He joined Japanese Top League side Toyota Verblitz for the 2017–18 season.

References

External links

WP rugby profile
Stormers profile

Bulls profile

Living people
1989 births
South African rugby union players
Stormers players
Western Province (rugby union) players
Golden Lions players
Blue Bulls players
ACT Brumbies players
Rugby union fly-halves
Rugby union players from Bloemfontein
University of the Free State alumni
Afrikaner people
Expatriate rugby union players in Australia
South African expatriates in Australia
South Africa Under-20 international rugby union players
Southern Kings players
Sharks (rugby union) players
Sharks (Currie Cup) players
Toyota Verblitz players

Alumni of Queen's College Boys' High School